The British left is a range of political parties and movements in the United Kingdom. These can take the position of either centre-left, left-wing, or far-left.

The largest political party associated with the British Left is the Labour Party, which is also the biggest political party in the UK by membership levels, with 415,000 members as of July 2022. Labour has 199 seats in the House of Commons (not including two MPs elected as Labour who as of 2021 have their whip withdrawn), and has been the Official Opposition since May 2010. The current Leader of the Labour Party is Keir Starmer, who was first elected on 4 April 2020.

The second largest party on the British left, by membership, is the centre-left Scottish National Party (SNP), which has over 125,000 members despite only being active in Scotland. The third largest party on the British left is the Green Party of England and Wales, whose membership reached 50,000 in September 2019. The party has one Member of Parliament, Caroline Lucas, who was first elected as the MP for Brighton Pavilion at the 2010 general election. She was also Leader of the party from 2008–2012 and then co-leader with Jonathan Bartley from 2016–2018.

The other three political parties on the left and with representation in parliament are the centre-left Social Democratic and Labour Party (SDLP) of Northern Ireland; the centre-left Plaid Cymru (who are only active in Wales) and Sinn Féin, also from Northern Ireland. The SNP has 45 MPs, Plaid has three MPs, the SDLP have two MPs, and Sinn Féin has seven, but the latter party does not sit in Westminster as it refuses to take the parliamentary Oath of Allegiance. In total the British left therefore have 252 out of 650 MPs.

History

Active in Britain

Labour Party

The biggest party on the left in the UK in terms of members and representation is the Labour Party, which was founded as the Labour Representation Committee (LRC) in 1900. With the party's rebranding as "New Labour" in the 1990s under the leadership of Tony Blair, the party accepted a number of economic policies associated with the right causing it to be identified as centrist rather than socialist, and was no longer considered as being a party of the left; Blair himself described New Labour's ideology as "Third Way", like Bill Clinton's Democratic Party in the United States. The Labour Party under Blair's leadership accepted many of the neoliberal economic policies enforced by the previous Conservative governments.

When Ed Miliband was elected as Leader of the Labour Party in 2010, he announced the abandonment of the New Labour agenda, and promised to return to socialism, clamp down on tax avoidance, introduce a wealth tax in the form of a Mansion Tax, raise income tax for high earners and break up the banks. The party was subsequently criticised by some, including Tony Blair himself; as straying leftwards from the "centre ground" of British politics, and that Miliband was a "traditional left-wing" politician. However, others disputed this view, and put Labour's loss at the 2015 general election down to the party being too right-wing.

The unexpected landslide victory of Jeremy Corbyn at the subsequent Labour Party leadership election in September 2015 represented a revival of the Labour left-wing and led to a huge increase in membership; in the Cabinet reshuffle that followed, John McDonnell (chairman of the Labour Representation Committee) and Diane Abbott (member of the Socialist Campaign Group) were both appointed to the Shadow Cabinet. While not winning, Labour made modest improvements at the 2017 general election which was taken as a vindication by some of the left turn. The party fell in the 2019 general election to its lowest share of seats since 1935, although many believe this was due to a complicated manifesto and Brexit policy, a poor approach to campaigning and the unpopularity of Corbyn.

Labour's status as a socialist party has been disputed by those who do not see the party as being part of the left, although the general consensus is that Labour are a left-wing political party.

Internal groups
Fabian Society
Campaign for Labour Party Democracy
Progress
Open Labour
Momentum
Socialist Campaign Group
Labour Representation Committee
Centre-Left Grassroots Alliance

Magazine support 
Tribune
Chartist

Green Party of England and Wales
In 2015, the membership of the Green Party quadrupled, and its support in national opinion polls sextupled. Several factors contributed, including the collapse of the Lib Dem vote, the influence of social media and greater awareness among younger people about the rise of other left-wing parties in Europe such as: Podemos in Spain and Syriza in Greece, as well as a rise in anti-austerity movements across the UK and Europe. Other factors included the Scottish independence referendum, which proved to be an inspiration for a new kind of politics. Other key factors had been the contrast in conferences of the Green Party and Labour in September 2014, and the media exclusion of the Greens during and following their successes at the European elections; a petition against the media blackout of the Green Party reached 260,000 signatures.

The party also received a significant spike in membership during January 2015 following David Cameron's demand that the Greens be included in the leaders' debates for the 2015 general election. The Green Party has been included in a seven-way television debate. The Greens' 2015 spring conference had a record 1,300 members attend; the party became the second-largest of the European Greens in this period, as well as increasing significantly in national polls from an average 1% to 7%. It beat the Liberal Democrats to fourth place at the 2014 European Elections with 8%, under a proportional voting system, having a third MEP elected. However the Greens achieved only a 1.6% vote share at the 2017 general election, following a rejection by Labour of an election pact and an increase in vote share by the two major parties.

In the 2019 general election, the Green Party increased their vote share by 65% to 2.7%. In the 2021 local elections the party made a net gain of 91 council seats, taking its national total to a record 444.

The status of the Greens as a party of the left has, along with Labour, been disputed.

Internal groups
Green Left

Other organisations
The now defunct Respect Party (formed in 2004), which at one point had the support of other left groups (such as the Socialist Workers Party and Socialist Resistance) and some electoral success, lost its last local councillors in 2014 and its sole MP George Galloway - who was also the party leader. Respect disbanded after twelve years, on 18 August 2016.

The Trade Unionist and Socialist Coalition (TUSC), founded in 2010, comprises the Socialist Party, Socialist Workers Party and RMT trade union. As of 2016, TUSC had a small number of affiliated local councillors. Following the 2015 election of Jeremy Corbyn as Labour leader, TUSC floated plans for a future electoral pact with any Labour councillors standing on an anti-austerity platform; subsequently TUSC stood fewer candidates in the 2016 and 2017 local elections, based on a case by case reckoning of the political stance of local Labour candidates. In May 2017, TUSC confirmed that it would stand no candidates at the forthcoming general election, and give full support to Labour. In 2018, TUSC suspended electoral activity until further notice. In September 2020, TUSC became active once again as its steering committee agreed it would stand candidates in the local elections in May 2021.
 
A new party, Left Unity, was formed in November 2013 and backed by a number of existing left-wing parties. Left Unity had an electoral pact with TUSC for the 2015 elections but has since renounced independent electoral activity in favour of Labour.

The Communist Party of Britain (CPB), is a split from (and effectively the political successor to) the historical Communist Party of Great Britain, once the largest British far-left organisation. In 2017, the CPB announced that it would field no candidates at that year's general election, and give support to Labour instead.

Some small left and far-left parties continue to contest elections independently, such as the Socialist Party of Great Britain (the oldest extant left-wing political party, having formed in 1904). Other parties and groups are electorally inactive, renounce participation in elections, or work unofficially in support of, or advocate a vote for, the Labour Party.

Electorally active parties
Alliance for Green Socialism
Breakthrough Party
Communist League
Left Unity
Mebyon Kernow (only active in Cornwall)
National Health Action Party
Socialist Equality Party
Socialist Labour Party
Socialist Party of Great Britain
Trade Unionist and Socialist Coalition (TUSC)
Workers Party of Britain
Workers' Revolutionary Party

Entryist groups within Labour Party 

Socialist Action

Parties working within TUSC

Socialist Party (England and Wales)
Socialist Party Scotland
Socialist Workers Party [in Scotland only]

Others
Alliance for Workers' Liberty
Anarchist Federation
Communist Party of Britain
Communist Party of Britain (Marxist–Leninist) 
Communist Party of Great Britain (Marxist–Leninist) 
Communist Party of Great Britain (Provisional Central Committee)
Communist Workers Organisation
International Socialist League
New Communist Party of Britain
Revolutionary Communist Group
Revolutionary Communist Party of Britain (Marxist–Leninist)
Socialist Alternative (England, Wales & Scotland)
Socialist Appeal
Socialist Resistance
Solidarity Federation
Spartacist League
Workers' Fight
Workers' Power

Active only in Scotland
Republican Communist Network
Scottish Greens
Scottish National Party
Scottish Republican Socialist Movement
Scottish Socialist Party
Socialist Party Scotland

Deregistered or dissolved
RISE – Scotland's Left Alliance (deregistered in November 2020)
Solidarity (deregistered and dissolved in 2021)

Active only in Wales
Plaid Cymru
Wales Green Party (semi-autonomous within Green Party of England and Wales)

Local parties
Birmingham Worker
Old Swan Against the Cuts
Lewisham People Before Profit
West Dunbartonshire Community Party

Media

Media and publications affiliated to organisations
Emancipation and Liberation (Republican Communist Network).
News Line (WRP).
The New Worker (NCP).
Scottish Socialist Voice (SSP).
The Socialist (SP).
Socialist Appeal monthly newspaper by a group of the same name.
Socialist Resistance periodical by a group of the same name.
Socialist Standard (SPGB).
Socialist Studies quarterly journal by a group of the same name.
Socialist Worker/Socialist Review (SWP).
Solidarity (AWL).
Weekly Worker (CPGB-PCC).
World Socialist Web Site (SEP).

Unaffiliated
Morning Star (Independent since 1945 but Britain's Road to Socialism, the programme of the CPB, underlies the paper's editorial stance)
New Statesman (founded 1913)
Red Pepper (founded 1995)
Left Foot Forward (founded 2010)
Novara Media (founded 2011)
Byline Times (founded 2014)
Evolve Politics (founded 2015)
The Squawkbox (founded 2012)
The Canary (founded 2015)
Black Isle Media (founded 2018)
Bywire News (founded 2021)

See also

 Anarchism in the United Kingdom
 Broad Left
 Convention of the Left
 Far-left politics in the United Kingdom
 History of socialism in the United Kingdom
 History of trade unions in the United Kingdom
 Liberation Left
 List of left-wing publications in the United Kingdom
 List of political parties in the United Kingdom
 List of trade unions in the United Kingdom
 National Campaign Against Fees and Cuts
 New Labour
 New Left
 Socialist Alliance
 Socialist Students
 Trade unions in the United Kingdom

References 

Politics of the United Kingdom
Communism in the United Kingdom
Socialism in the United Kingdom
Left-wing politics in the United Kingdom